The HWM 51 was an open-wheel race car, designed by Briton John Heath, and developed and built by HWM (Hersham and Walton Motors), in 1951. It competed in voiturette racing events, as well as two Formula One World Championship Grand Prix events; the 1951 Swiss Grand Prix, and the 1952 Belgian Grand Prix.

References

Formula One cars
Open wheel racing cars
1950s cars